Achille Grandi (24 August 1883 – 28 September 1946) was an Italian politician and catholic syndicalist.

Grandi was born in Como, Italy.  In 1918 he entered the secretariat of the Confederazione Italiana dei Lavoratori CIL being one of its founding members, with Ulisse Carbone. He was elected CIL general secretary from 1922 to 1926 and brought the CIL up to 2 million members. In 1919 he was among the founding members of Partito Popolare Italiano becoming member of the parliament the same year. During fascism he didn't collaborate and survived working in a printing house. On 3 June 1944 he was one of the promoters and signatories of the Pact of Rome, which originated the unified CGIL and was the germ of all post-war Italian trade-unionism. In August 1944 he founded the Associazioni Cristiane dei Lavoratori Italiani (ACLI) becoming just for 6 months their president. As member of Democrazia Cristiana he was elected in 1946 to the Constituent Assembly of Italy. He died two months later in Desio nearby Milan, aged 63.

See also
Pact of Rome
Associazioni Cristiane dei Lavoratori Italiani (ACLI)
Constituent Assembly of Italy

Notes

External links
  Achille  Grandi file on aclilombardia.it

1883 births
1946 deaths
People from Como
Italian Roman Catholics
Italian People's Party (1919) politicians
Christian Democracy (Italy) politicians
Deputies of Legislature XXV of the Kingdom of Italy
Deputies of Legislature XXVI of the Kingdom of Italy
Deputies of Legislature XXVII of the Kingdom of Italy
Members of the National Council (Italy)
Members of the Constituent Assembly of Italy
Politicians of Lombardy
Italian trade unionists
Italian syndicalists
Italian Aventinian secessionists